Aquila X-1 (frequently abbreviated to Aql X-1) is a low-mass x-ray binary (LMXB) and the most luminous X-Ray source in the constellation Aquila.  It was first observed by the satellite Vela 5B which detected several outbursts from this source between 1969 and 1976. Its optical counterpart is variable, so it was named V1333 Aql according to the IAU standards. The system hosts a neutron star that accretes matter from a main sequence star of spectral type K4. The binary's orbital period is 18.9479 hours.

The neutron star radiation flux is slightly variable due to the nuclear burning of the accreted helium on the surface.

References

K-type main-sequence stars
Neutron stars
X-ray binaries
Aquila (constellation)
Aquilae, V1333
J19111604+0035058